Pavel Kharagezov is a Paralympian athlete from Russia competing mainly in category T36 middle-distance events.

He competed in the 2008 Summer Paralympics in Beijing, China.  There he won a bronze medal in the men's 800 metres - T36 event and finished fourth in the men's 400 metres - T36 event

External links
 

Paralympic athletes of Russia
Athletes (track and field) at the 2008 Summer Paralympics
Paralympic bronze medalists for Russia
Living people
Year of birth missing (living people)
Medalists at the 2008 Summer Paralympics
Paralympic medalists in athletics (track and field)
Russian male middle-distance runners
21st-century Russian people